was a Japanese samurai and commander of the Sengoku period. He was the head of the Inaba Yamana clan and Shugo of the Inaba.

In 1574, Toyokuni allied with  Amago Katsuhisa for attempt an invasion to captured Tajima and Inaba provinces. 

In 1581, his Tottori Castle was besieged by the Oda Nobunaga's army led Hashiba Hideyoshi. After three months of the Siege, Toyokuni surrendered. Thereafter, he became a masterless samurai for a while. 

In 1600, at the Battle of Sekigahara, he joined the Western army and after the battle he was given small territory in the Tajima Province by Tokugawa Ieyasu.

Further reading
 Ranse wo Kanndotta Otoko 『乱世を看取った男 山名豊国』,吉川永青 (角川春樹事務所, 2021)

References

Samurai
Daimyo
1548 births
1626 deaths
People from Hyōgo Prefecture